Tallinn Music High School is a special music high school in Tallinn, Estonia.

History

TMHS was founded in 1961 to ensure a sufficient number of quality applicants to the Tallinn State Conservatory (now Estonian Academy of Music and Theatre). It has successfully fulfilled its goal, as 80-100% of graduates continue their studies at EAMT or at other music academies abroad.

TMHS is the only school in Estonia that provides a professional music education alongside the general primary and secondary curriculum. This system prepares students for a career in music or in any other field.

There are 38 senior teachers and 23 teachers on staff with qualifications to teach at the university level. Also, no fewer than 27 professors from the Estonian Academy of Music and Theatre also tutor students at TMHS.

Principals

1961–1965 Eugen Kapp
1965–1968 Jüri Plink  
1968–1975 Endel Loitme 
1975–1977 Harald Aasa 
1977–1987 Ants Elvik
1987–1991  Jüri Plink 
1991–2005 Tiina Ehin
2005– Timo Steiner

Notable alumni

Most of Estonia's better-known musicians of the middle and younger generations are alumnae of TMHS, including:

Composers:
 René Eespere
 Mati Kuulberg
 Rein Rannap
 Jüri Reinvere
 Urmas Sisask
 Lepo Sumera
 Helena Tulve
 Ardo Ran Varres

Conductors:
 Olari Elts
 Tõnu Kaljuste
 Mikk Murdvee
 Andres Mustonen
 Erki Pehk
 Anu Tali
 Elmo Tiisvald
 Arvo Volmer

Pianists:
 Ivari Ilja
 Peep Lassmann
 Sten Lassmann
 Marko Martin
 Mihkel Poll
 Kalle Randalu

References

External links

 

Schools in Tallinn
Educational institutions established in 1961
1961 establishments in Estonia